DCC may refer to:

Biology
Deleted in Colorectal Cancer gene, and the receptor product of the same name
Dosage compensation complex, a protein complex involved in genetic dosage compensation

Business
DC Comics
Day Chocolate Company
Day Count Convention, financial term 
DCC Plc, formerly Development Capital Corporation Limited, an Irish investments holding company
DCC Doppelmayr Cable Car, cable car company
Digital Cybercherries Ltd., a British game development studio
Dynamic currency conversion

Chemistry
Dynamic combinatorial chemistry, a method to the generation of new molecules formed by the reversible reaction of relatively simple components under thermodynamic control
[[N,N'-Dicyclohexylcarbodiimide|N,N'''-Dicyclohexylcarbodiimide]], a peptide coupling chemical reagent used in organic synthesis

Computing and electronics
Data Communications Channel, part of the overhead in Synchronous Optical Networking (SONET)
Data Country Code, numeric 3-digit country codes as defined in X.121
Digital Command Control, a system for controlling model trains
Digital Compact Cassette, Philips system with digital audio on compact cassette
Digital Computer Controls, Inc., a 1960s-1970s era company that made computer system clones
Digital content creation, a category of tools used for creation of electronic media
Direct cable connection, for networking two computers together
Direct Client-to-Client, a protocol for file transfer and direct chat on Internet Relay Chat (IRC)
Directed Channel Change, part of the digital video broadcast ATSC transport stream
Distributed Checksum Clearinghouse, a hash-sharing system for detecting e-mail spam
Delta Color Compression, a lossless color compression technique implemented in the graphics core next (GCN) GPU architecture from AMD

Education
Dallas Christian College, a four-year undergraduate college located in Farmers Branch, Texas
Danville Community College, a junior college in Danville, Virginia
Delgado Community College, a junior college in New Orleans, Louisiana
Detroit Catholic Central High School, Novi, Michigan
Dhaka City College, a private college of Bangladesh
Dutchess Community College, a junior college in Poughkeepsie, New York

Government
Arkansas Department of Community Correction
Dallas City Council - see Law and government of Dallas
Devon County Council in the United Kingdom
Dhaka City Corporation in Bangladesh 
Dorset County Council in the United Kingdom
Dublin City Council in Ireland
Dunedin City Council in New Zealand
Department of Climate Change, a now defunct government department in Australia

Mathematics
Descending Chain Condition, in the field of order theory in mathematics

Organizations
DCC Alliance, a now-defunct Debian-based industry consortium
Dennistoun Community Council, a community council in Glasgow, Scotland
Digital Copyright Canada, a group advocating against excessive intellectual property laws in Canada
Downcounty Consortium, A consortium of five high schools in the Montgomery County, Maryland, public school system

Politics
District Coordination Committee, a district level authority found in Nepal

Other uses
Dallas Convention Center
Dallas Country Club
Dallas Cowboys Cheerleaders
Daejeon Convention Center, a facility in South Korea
Death Crew Council, a wrestling stable in TNA
Defence Construction Canada
Denver Comic Con, a 3-day multigenre convention held annually in Denver, Colorado
Deputy Chief Constable, a British police rank
Digital Curation Centre, a United Kingdom Centre of Leadership for digital longevityDungeon Crawl Classics'', a fantasy role playing game
Dynamic currency conversion
The Roman number for 700
Document kind classification code, according to IEC 61355

See also
DC (disambiguation)
DCCC (disambiguation)